Nashville (previously Cleveland) was the codename for a cancelled release of Microsoft Windows scheduled to be released in 1996, between "Chicago" (Windows 95) and "Memphis" (Windows 98, at the time scheduled for release in 1996, later 1997), causing it to be referred to as Windows 96 by contemporary press. Nashville was intended to be a minor release focusing on a tighter integration between Windows and Internet Explorer, in order to better compete with Netscape Navigator.

Microsoft claimed that Nashville would add Internet integration features to the Windows 95 and NT 4.0 desktop, building on the new features in the Internet Explorer 3.0 web browser (due for release a few months before Nashville). Touted features included a combined file manager and web browser, the ability to seamlessly open Microsoft Office documents from within Internet Explorer using ActiveX technology and a way to place dynamic web pages directly on the desktop in place of the regular static wallpaper.

A leaked build had version number 4.10.999 (in comparison to Windows 95's 4.00.950, Windows 95 OSR2's 4.00.1111, Windows 98's 4.10.1998, Windows 98 Second Edition's 4.10.2222 A, and Windows ME's 4.90.3000). The project was eventually cancelled as a full release of Windows, with Windows 95 OSR2 being shipped as an interim release instead. The codename "Nashville" was then reused for the Windows Desktop Update that shipped with Internet Explorer 4.0 and delivered most of the features promised for Nashville. The Athena PIM application would be released as Microsoft Internet Mail and News in 1996 along with IE3, which would later be renamed to Outlook Express in 1997 with IE4.

See also
List of Microsoft codenames

Notes

References
Microsoft confidential
Comes v. Microsoft. Plaintiff's Exhibit 2013: "Desktop Operating Systems Mission—Draft". Microsoft Confidential (February 4, 1994).
Comes v. Microsoft. Plaintiff's Exhibit 3208: "Desktop Operating Systems Mission Memo". Microsoft Confidential.
Comes v. Microsoft. Plaintiff's Exhibit 5648: "Systems Three Year Plan". Microsoft Confidential (April 1994).
Comes v. Microsoft. Plaintiff's Exhibit 2247: "Personal Systems Division 3 Yr Outlook". Microsoft Confidential (February 28, 1995).
Comes v. Microsoft. Plaintiff's Exhibit 5735: Microsoft Confidential (October 25, 1995).
Comes v. Microsoft. Plaintiff's Exhibit 2667: (March 10, 1997)
Articles
 Miller, Michael J. (24 October 1995). "Beyond Windows 95". PC Magazine. pp. 75–76.
 Honeyball, Jon (June 1996). "The Road to Cairo Goes Through Nashville". Windows IT Pro.
Other
 Schnoll, Scott. "The History of Microsoft Internet Explorer ".

External links 

 Windows Nashville (build 999) on the Internet Archive

96
96